Khar Kosh or Khar Kesh or Kharkash may refer to:
 Khar Kosh, Kermanshah, a village in Kermanshah Province, Iran
 Khar Kesh, Mazandaran, a village in Mazandaran Province, Iran